The 1983 Baltimore Colts season was the 31st season for the team in the National Football League (NFL). This would be the last season in Baltimore as they moved to Indianapolis for the following season. The Colts finished the year with a record of 7 wins and 9 losses, and tied for fourth in the AFC East division with the New York Jets. However, the Colts finished ahead of New York based on better conference record (5–9 to Jets’ 4–8).

Having finished the 1982 season with the NFL's worst record at a winless 0–8–1, the Colts held the No. 1 pick in the 1983 NFL draft and expected to land the nation's top collegiate player to their 1983 roster. The Colts used the top pick on John Elway of Stanford. Elway, however, refused to play for the Colts and even considered joining the New York Yankees baseball organization unless he was traded. The Colts were forced to trade Elway to the Denver Broncos and Mike Pagel retained his position as starting quarterback. The Elway controversy became more interesting when Elway's Broncos visited Baltimore for the second game of the season. The Broncos won that game 17–10. Later, when the teams faced each other again in Denver for the second-to-last game of the season, the Colts took a 19–0 lead over the Broncos, only to blow the lead in the fourth quarter and lose 21–19. They won their final game as a Baltimore team against the Houston Oilers 20–10. This left Baltimore without an NFL team until the Ravens began play in 1996. Professional football was reintroduced to the Baltimore market in 1994 with the creation of the Baltimore Stallions Canadian Football League team during what was essentially an ill-fated American expansion.

Offseason

NFL draft

Undrafted free agents

Personnel

Staff

Roster

Regular season

Schedule

Game summaries

Week 1

Week 15 at Broncos

Standings

See also 
 History of the Indianapolis Colts
 Indianapolis Colts seasons
 Colts–Patriots rivalry

References 

Baltimore Colts
1983
Baltimore